Ennigaldi-Nanna's museum is the earliest known public museum. It dates to circa 530 BCE. The curator was Ennigaldi, the daughter of Nabonidus, the last king of the Neo-Babylonian Empire.

Discovery 
The museum was discovered in 1925, when archaeologist Leonard Woolley excavated portions of the palace and temple complex at Ur.
He found dozens of artifacts, neatly arranged side by side, whose ages varied by centuries.  He determined that they were actually museum pieces, because they were accompanied by "museum labels" — clay drums with labels in three different languages, including Sumerian.

History
The palace grounds that included the museum were at the ancient building referred to as E-Gig-Par, which included Ennigaldi’s living quarters as well as subsidiary buildings.

Ennigaldi's father Nabonidus, an antiquarian and antique restorer, is known as the first serious archeologist. He taught her to appreciate ancient artifacts and influenced her to create her educational antiquity museum.

The artifacts came from the southern regions of Mesopotamia.
Many had originally been excavated by Nabonidus and were from as early as the 20th century BCE. Some artifacts had been collected previously by Nebuchadnezzar. Some are thought to have been excavated by Ennigaldi herself.

Ennigaldi stored the artifacts in a temple next to the palace where she lived.
She used the museum pieces to explain the history of the area and to interpret material aspects of her dynasty's heritage.

Some of these artifacts were:
 A kudurru, Kassite boundary marker (carved with a snake and emblems of various gods).
 Part of a statue of King Shulgi
 A clay cone that had been part of a building at Larsa.

References

Sources

530s BC
Defunct museums
History of museums
Babylon
Ur
Archaeological museums in Iraq
6th-century BC establishments